Pachyballus mombasensis is a species of jumping spider in the genus Pachyballus that lives in Kenya. The species was first described in 2020.

References

Salticidae
Spiders described in 2020
Spiders of Africa
Taxa named by Wanda Wesołowska